Alexander van Hattem (born 6 June 1983) is a Dutch politician who has been a member of the Senate for the Party for Freedom since 2015 and is a member of the Provincial Council of North Brabant.

van Hatten studied history at Radboud University before completing a law course at Avans Hogeschool in Tilburg and has run a legal consultancy business since 2005. He was previously a member of the Pim Fortuyn List (LPF) and was chairman of the LPF's youth wing Jonge Fortuynisten. He subsequently worked as an intern for the Party for Freedom and was elected to the Provincial Council of North Brabant in 2014 where he served as chairman of the Culture and Society Committee. That same year he encountered some controversy when he expressed support for controversial remarks made by Geert Wilders about Moroccan immigrants. After calls from other parties for him to be removed from the Culture and Society Committee, van Hatten apologized and was allowed to keep his position. In 2015, he was elected to sit in the Senate for the PVV.

Electoral history

References

1983 births
Living people
Radboud University Nijmegen alumni
Members of the Senate (Netherlands)
Party for Freedom politicians
Pim Fortuyn List politicians 
21st-century Dutch politicians
People from Bergeijk